The discography of Swedish electronic music duo The Knife consists of five studio albums, one mini-album, one live album, one soundtrack album, two video albums, two extended plays, 19 singles, one promotional single, 18 music videos, and two short films.

Albums

Studio albums

Remix albums

Soundtrack albums

Live albums

Extended plays

Singles

Promotional singles

Remixes

Videography

Video albums

Music videos

Short films

References

External links
 
 
 

Discographies of Swedish artists
Electronic music discographies